La Roche-sur-Yon Agglomération is the communauté d'agglomération, an intercommunal structure, centred on the city of La Roche-sur-Yon. It is located in the Vendée department, in the Pays de la Loire region, western France. Created in 2010, its seat is in La Roche-sur-Yon. Its area is 499.4 km2. Its population was 97,771 in 2019, of which 55,147 in La Roche-sur-Yon proper.

Composition
The communauté d'agglomération consists of the following 13 communes:

Aubigny-Les Clouzeaux
La Chaize-le-Vicomte
Dompierre-sur-Yon
La Ferrière
Fougeré
Landeronde
Mouilleron-le-Captif
Nesmy
Rives de l'Yon
La Roche-sur-Yon
Le Tablier
Thorigny
Venansault

References

Roche-sur-Yon
Roche-sur-Yon